Phytoecia geniculata is a species of beetle in the family Cerambycidae. It was described by Mulsant in 1862. It has a wide distribution between Europe and the Middle East.

Subspecies
 Phytoecia geniculata orientalis Kraatz, 1871
 Phytoecia geniculata geniculata Mulsant, 1862

References

Phytoecia
Beetles described in 1862